The Green Party Northern Ireland (sometimes abbreviated as Green Party NI) is a political party in Northern Ireland. Like many green political parties around the world, its origins lie in the anti-nuclear, labour and peace movements of the 1970s and early 1980s.

Since 2006, the party has operated as a region of the Green Party of Ireland and also maintains links with other Green parties, including the Scottish Greens and the Green Party of England and Wales.

The party has a youth wing operating in Northern Ireland, the Young Greens.

The party also has LGBT policies and an activist group operating in Northern Ireland, the Queer Greens.

Policies
The Green Party has four key values: social justice, environmental sustainability, grassroots democracy and non-violence. It is considered to be more to the left than most parties in Northern Ireland.

The Green Party has been involved in several major campaigns since entering the Northern Ireland Assembly, including clean rivers and anti-nuclear campaigns, opposition to fracking, and fighting the austerity agenda. It has also campaigned against the development of incinerators at Belfast North Foreshore and Lough Neagh, and against proposals to extend the airport runway at George Best Belfast City Airport.

The Green Party campaigns not just for more environmental protection but also for politics for the common good. Former leader Steven Agnew has championed the rights of children in Northern Ireland through his Private Member's Bill which is seeking to establish a statutory duties on government departments to work together to deliver optimum children's services. Agnew has also been a long-standing supporter of integrated education and a society based on equal rights and mutual respect for all traditions. This has included bringing forward the first motion on same-sex marriage to the Northern Ireland Assembly in 2011. The party has also called for funding to be focused on improving public transport infrastructure and supports the creation of an independent environmental protection agency for Northern Ireland. They also campaign for a shift to alternative energy for Northern Ireland and were involved in the setting up of a lobby group for the sector. The Green Party in Northern Ireland campaigns for transparency in political funding, responsive local government, effective community planning, dynamic and sustainable local economies, environmental protection, and for animal welfare.

On the constitutional status of Northern Ireland, Agnew believes the status quo should remain "until the people of Northern Ireland decide otherwise", but stated that the Green Party does not consider the issue as one that should divide its members or society. The party has also called for greater transparency in politics, arguing that political donations in Northern Ireland should be made public. Northern Ireland is the only region of the United Kingdom where political donations are secret.

The party has said it wants a citizens' assembly to examine if drugs should be decriminalised to reduce deaths. In March 2021, then deputy leader and now leader of the party since August 2022, Malachai O'Hara, said legalisation and harm-reduction models should be considered as the "current approach is obviously not working". In 2020, drug deaths in Northern Ireland were recorded at 218 according to official figures. This was an increase from the official recorded figure in 2019, which stood at 191 drug deaths in Northern Ireland and 92 in 2010, indicating the figure had more than double in a decade.

History 

In the Northern Ireland local elections of May 1981, Peter Emerson, Avril McCandless and Malcolm Samuels stood as the first candidates to use the Ecology label in Northern Ireland and gained 202, 81 and 61 votes respectively; the first in a large urban area, the other two in smaller rural constituencies. Emerson had previously stood in the same area in 1977.

In May 1983, the Northern Ireland Ecology Party was launched at a press conference held in the Europa Hotel, Belfast, with members of the British and Irish Ecology parties in attendance. At the same time, the three parties put forward one combined policy on Northern Ireland, the first time that UK and Irish political parties had held a common Northern Ireland policy.

In 1985, ecology parties throughout the Republic of Ireland and the United Kingdom changed their names to Green Party.

The party became a region of the Green Party of Ireland in 2006. These arrangements are said to demonstrate the Northern Ireland party's cross-community nature, as the Green Party claim to be the only party that actually lives the Good Friday Agreement through its operational set up through north–south and east–west links.

In 2007, a Green society was established at Queen's University Belfast. In 2010, the LGBT Greens NI were established: a policy group and lobby group specialising in LGBT community issues within Northern Ireland. The LGBT group dissolved in early 2012 as their main aim—pushing for the inclusion of same-sex marriage within party policy—was achieved at the 2011 AGM after a unanimous vote.

The party supported a no vote in the 2011 Alternative Vote referendum.

In February 2015, the Queer Greens party group was set up to become the LGBT issues and activist wing of the party. The group is taking charge of party policy on LGBT rights, issues, welfare, campaigning, lobbying and raising awareness.

On 14 January 2016, the party announced that it had selected Ellen Murray as its candidate to contest the 2016 Northern Ireland Assembly elections for West Belfast, making her the first openly transgender person to stand for election on the island of Ireland.

Leaders 

 Steven Agnew (10 January 2011 – 21 November 2018)
 Clare Bailey (21 November 2018 – 15 August 2022)
 Malachai O'Hara (15 August 2022 – present)

Election results 
The party's first electoral success in Northern Ireland was at the local council elections of 2005. Raymond Blaney was elected onto Down District Council and Brian Wilson, formerly of the Alliance Party, took a seat on North Down Borough Council. The party's third local councillor was Ciaran Mussen, elected to Newry and Mourne District Council.

At the 2007 Northern Ireland Assembly election, the Green Party won its first seat in the Northern Ireland Assembly, when Brian Wilson won a seat in the North Down constituency. Overall the party won 11,985 first preference votes or 1.7% of the total – a rise of 1.4% since the 2003 Assembly election.

In 2009, the Green Party stood Steven Agnew in the European election  he secured 15,674 votes, trebling the Green Party's share of the vote. The Greens fought the election on the Green New Deal, calling for job creation in the green energy sector.

The Greens fielded four candidates in the 2010 UK general election, none of which managed to secure a seat. However, the number of votes for Green candidates more than trebled.

Brian Wilson MLA stood down ahead of the 2011 Assembly election, in which the party won a seat on North Down council, with their candidate Steven Agnew. Agnew subsequently stepped down from his position on North Down Borough Council as the party took a strong stand against so called 'double jobbing' or dual mandate; he was replaced by John Barry.

In May 2016 the Greens picked up their second seat in the Northern Ireland Assembly when Clare Bailey took a seat in South Belfast.

In 2019 the Greens picked up seats in local elections across the country. They managed to double the seats and won 4 seats in Belfast City Council.

Bailey and Rachel Woods were both defeated in the 2022 Northern Ireland Assembly election, leaving the party with no representation in Stormont for the first time since 2007.

Northern Ireland Assembly elections

UK Parliament elections

1983 general election

1987 general election

By-elections, 1987–1992

1997 general election

2010 general election

2015 general election

2017 general election

2019 general election

Northern Ireland local elections

European Parliament elections

Officers 
The Green Party's Chairperson is Kate Barry and the Secretary is Liz Byrne. The party treasurer is Luke Robinson.

The Party has spokespeople in the following areas:
North Down: Rachel Woods 
South Belfast: Clare Bailey
Bangor Central: Stephen Dunlop
Bangor West: Barry McKee
Holywood & Clandeboye: Lauren Kendall
Bangor East & Donaghadee: Ciara Henry
East Belfast: Anthony Flynn
North Belfast: Malachai O'Hara
Strangford: Ricky Bamford 
Young Greens: Ashley Jones
Queer Greens: Anthony Flynn

Elected representatives

Local councils
 Stephen Dunlop, Bangor Central, Ards & North Down Council
 Lauren Kendall, Holywood and Clandeboye, Ards & North Down Council
 Barry McKee, Bangor West, Ards & North Down Council
 Anthony Flynn, Ormiston, Belfast City Council
 Brian Smyth, Lisnasharragh, Belfast City Council
 Áine Groogan, Botanic, Belfast City Council
 Malachai O'Hara, Castle, Belfast City Council

See also

Green Party in Northern Ireland politicians
Demography and politics of Northern Ireland
Green party
Green politics
List of environmental organisations

References

External links
Official website
Queer Greens 
QUB Greens Blog

 
Green political parties